Bedford Clapperton Trevelyan Pim  (12 June 1826 – 30 September 1886) was a Royal Navy officer, Arctic explorer, barrister, and author. He was the first man who travelled from a ship on the eastern side of the Northwest Passage to one on the western side.

Early years
Pim was born in Bideford, Devon, England, son of Edward Bedford Pim of Weirhead, Exeter, a British navy officer who died of yellow fever in 1830 off the coast of Africa while engaged in the suppression of the slave trade, and Sophia Soltau Harrison, eldest daughter of John Fairweather Harrison, Esquire of Totnes. Educated at the Royal Naval School, the younger Pim went to India in the British Merchant Navy, and in 1842, upon return to England, was appointed a volunteer in the Royal Navy.

Career
In 1845, Pim was posted to the survey ship, HMS Herald, under Captain Henry Kellett. For the next six years he took part in surveys in the Falkland Islands, the western coast of South America, and north to British Columbia. During this time he took part in three detours to search for the missing Sir John Franklin expedition. He transferred from Herald to HMS Plover, wintering at Chamisso Island in Kotzebue Sound during 1849/50, spending considerable time with the local Malimiut, before returning to Herald. Pim was the first man to travel from a ship on the eastern side of the Northwest Passage to one on the western side.

Pim served in the Baltic in 1855 during the Crimean War commanding HMS Magpie where he was wounded.

He was wounded again in 1857 while commanding HMS Banterer in Chinese waters.

He was made a commander in 1858. The following year, he investigated the possibility of a transoceanic canal and became a proponent of the Nicaragua Canal.

Pim went to the West Indies in command of HMS Gorgon in 1860 and returned home on HMS Fury. He made post captain in 1868 and was compulsorily retired in 1870. He studied law after retirement and was called to the Bar of the Inner Temple in 1873. Pim practiced law in Bristol, mainly on admiralty cases, and became a magistrate for the county of Middlesex. He wrote, When Do Sheriffs Take Office? in 1879.

A Conservative, Pim stood unsuccessfully for election in Totnes in July 1865 and Gravesend in December 1868. He was elected Member of Parliament for Gravesend in 1874. Pim was made rear-admiral in 1885.

Pim wrote several articles, books, and pamphlets.  "Remarks on the Isthmus of Suez, with Special Reference to the Proposed Canal" was published in the Proceedings of the Royal Geographical Society of London in 1859, and Proposed Transit-Route across Central America, from a New Harbour in Nicaragua was published three years later.  His 1839 A Brief sketch of the life of the late Zachary Macaulay, Esq., F.R.S. As connected with the subjects of the abolition of the slave trade and slavery was his only biography. His journals as a Midshipman aboard the Herald provided most of the discussion for the Arctic portions of the six-year cruise.

Organisations

Pim belonged to several scientific organisations. He was elected a Fellow of the Royal Geographical Society in 1854. In 1861, he became an associate of the Institute of Civil Engineers. He was also an honorary member of the Dulwich College Science Society.

Personal life
Pim was a major landowner in Central America and the Caribbean. He married Susanna Locock on 3 October 1861 and they had two sons, including the Rev. Henry Bedford Pim.  They lived for a time at Belsize and Dulwich. Pim died at Deal, Kent, England, on 30 September 1886. A brass plaque honoring Pim was moved in 1981 from The Missions to Seamen Institute to St. Nicholas Church, Bristol, England.

Pim was a virulent racist. In both The Negro and Jamaica and Dottings on the Roadside he articulated personal concerns with the supposed "savagery" of African peoples. Despite the acclaim Pim has garnered for his explorations, many of his personal observations of Africans in Jamaica perpetuated falsely racist claims about cannibalism and profligacy.

Legacy

 Pim Island, Nunavut, Canada.
 Pim's Bay (variant Monkey Point),  of Greytown, Nicaragua

Partial works
 (1857) An earnest appeal to the British public on behalf of the missing Arctic Expedition.
 (1858) Notes on Cherbourg.
 (1863)  The Gate of the Pacific.
 (1868) The negro and Jamaica. Read before the Anthropological Society of London, etc.
 (1869) Dottings on the Roadside in Panama, Nicaragua, and Mosquito ... Illustrated with plates and maps.
 (s.d.) War chronicle, with memoirs of the emperor Napoleon III, the emperor-King William I, map and official documents, from the breaking out of the war to the final evacuation of French territory by the German troops.
In the 1870s he was the proprietor of a newspaper "The Navy Royal and Mercantile". Edition no.38 volume II bears the date "Saturday, Feb 13, 1875".
 (1876) British Manufacturing Industries series, vol. 10: "Ship-building"
 (1877) The Eastern question, past, present and future : with official documents.
 (1881). Gems from Greenwich Hospital.
 (1883). Transit across Central America.

References

External links 

 
 
 

1826 births
1886 deaths
British polar explorers
Conservative Party (UK) MPs for English constituencies
Fellows of the Royal Geographical Society
Members of the Inner Temple
Writers from Bideford
Royal Navy rear admirals
Royal Navy personnel of the Crimean War
Royal Navy personnel of the Second Opium War
UK MPs 1874–1880
Military personnel from Bideford